Metapogon is a genus of robber flies in the family Asilidae. There are about 13 described species in Metapogon.

Species
These 13 species belong to the genus Metapogon:

 Metapogon amargosae Wilcox, 1972 i c g
 Metapogon carinatus Wilcox, 1964 i c g
 Metapogon gibber (Williston, 1883) i c g
 Metapogon gilvipes Coquillett, 1904 i c g
 Metapogon holbrooki Wilcox, 1964 i c g
 Metapogon hurdi Wilcox, 1964 i c g
 Metapogon incertus Becker, 1919 c g
 Metapogon leechi Wilcox, 1964 c g
 Metapogon obispae Wilcox, 1972 i c g
 Metapogon pictus Cole, 1916 i c g
 Metapogon punctipennis Coquillett, 1904 i c g b
 Metapogon tarsalus Wilcox, 1964 i c g
 Metapogon tricellus Wilcox, 1964 i c g

Data sources: i = ITIS, c = Catalogue of Life, g = GBIF, b = Bugguide.net

References

Further reading

 
 
 

Asilidae genera
Articles created by Qbugbot